Antonio Maria Montanari (29 November 1676 in Modena – 2 April 1737 in Rome) was an Italian violinist and composer of the Baroque period.

Life 
Nothing is known of Antonio Maria Montanari's childhood or his musical education but he was already in Rome as a young man, and between 1692 and 1737 documentation exists (albeit with interruptions) indicating his involvement as a violinist, often in important positions, in the orchestra of Cardinal Ottoboni. From 1712 onwards he appears to have held a permanent post in the Ottoboni household but he also served other families of the Roman nobility, and he is thus found among the musicians who performed in George Frederic Handel's La Resurrezione in 1708 in the Palazzo Ruspoli. On this occasion, and on others documented from 1694 onwards, he is referred to as ‘Antonio del sig.r card.le Colonna’, which suggests that he had already been in the service of Cardinal Giovanni Paolo Colonna for some time. Between 1695 and 1708 he was in the service of Cardinal Benedetto Pamphili and of the Accademia del Disegno di S Luca.

Montanari must have had considerable standing as a violinist, his name always appearing near the top of the lists of players. His reputation was such that Johann Georg Pisendel, who had already studied with Giuseppe Torelli and Antonio Vivaldi, took lessons from him in 1717. In his op. 5 trio sonatas of 1707 Giuseppe Valentini entitled one work La Montanari. He also dedicated a sonnet to Montanari in his collection of Rime, and another sonata by him entitled La Montanari exists in Dresden.

The most important single source of biographical information on Antonio Maria Montanari is a commemorative seven-line paragraph squeezed in at the foot
of a lightly caricatural pen sketch of the composer by the famous artist Pier Leone Ghezzi:

"S.r Antonio Montanari virtuossisimo sonator di violino, e poi era accompagniata la virtù con un costume da angelo il quale morì alli due di aprile 1737. alle ore 23. e la sua morte è stata compianta da tutta Roma, et io cav. Ghezzi me ne sono lassata la presente memoria il giorno doppo la sua morte, il quale morì in 3 giorni di pontura in età di anni 62 e fu esposto nella chiesa di S. Apostoli dove gli fù cantata messa solenne da tutti i professori di musica tanto cantanti, che sonatori, con 12 faccolotti, ove in detta chiesa riposerà sino al giuditio. Amen. Il med.o nacque alli 29 di novembre del 1676 alle ore 5."

According to contemporary sources, Montanari experimented with enharmonic micro-intervals. His high standing as a violinist suggests that he would have had a teacher-pupil relationship with many talented players in Rome, especially after the death of Arcangelo Corelli, including, perhaps, Pietro Antonio Locatelli. Montanari's works have yet to be studied in depth.

His Concerti op.1 are exceptionally well crafted, the alliance of virtuosity with solid contrapuntal writing suggesting the possibility of a lineage of post-Corellian solo concerto such as no other composer attempted. Hitherto almost completely ignored, Montanari's concertos rank amongst the most impressive achievements in the Italian repertoire.

Works 
 1 Sonata in a collection Sonate a violino e violoncello di vari autori (Bologna 1695)
 6 Sonatas for solo violin, cello and basso continuo op. 1 (Le Cène, Amsterdam c. 1726; published under the name of Francesco Montanaro)
 8 Concerti op. 1  (Amsterdam c. 1730)
 2 Concerti (Dresden)
 other sonatas and chamber music works

Literature 
 Michael Talbot: A successor of Corelli: Antonio Montanari and his sonatas. In: Recercare, 17 (2005), p. 211–251.
 Simon McVeigh and Jehoash Hirshberg: The Italian Solo Concerto 1700-1760 p. 162-164.

Selected discography 
 Montanari - Violin concertos, Johannes Pramsohler, Ensemble Diderot (Audax Records ADX13704)
 Corelli's Legacy, European Union Baroque Orchestra, Riccardo Minasi (K&K Verlagsanstalt)
 Per Monsieur Pisendel, La Serenissima, Adrian Chandler (AVIE)
1717. Memories of a Journey to Italy. Pisendel, Vivaldi, Montanari, Fanfani, Valentini and Albinoni. Ensemble Scaramuccia. (Snakewood Editions, 2018).

References

External links 

1676 births
1737 deaths
Italian violinists
Male violinists
Italian male classical composers
Italian Baroque composers
17th-century Italian composers
18th-century Italian composers
18th-century Italian male musicians
17th-century male musicians